European Parliament elections were held in Greece on 25 May 2014 to elect the 21 Greek members of the European Parliament. The number of seats allocated to Greece declined from 22 to 21, as a result of the 2013 reapportionment of seats in the European Parliament.

According to Jim Yardley of The New York Times, "the vote has become a de facto referendum on the governing coalition and a test of whether ordinary citizens believe the government's assertion that the country is finally on the upswing."

Participating parties
46 parties and coalitions are participating in the elections:

 Union of Centrists
 Front of the Greek Anticapitalist Left
 OKDE
 ASKE
 National Unity
 Koinonia
 KEAN
 Part of Equality, Peace and Friendship
 Popular Orthodox Rally
 Party of Greek Hunters
 National Dawn
 Communist Party of Greece
 The River (To Potami)
 PAEKE
 : (incl. Drassi, Recreate Greece)
Golden Dawn
 EEK
 Lefko
 Greek Ecologists
 E.PA.M
 OAKKE
 Freedom
 Democratic Left
 National Front
 Olive Tree: (incl. PASOK, Agreement for the New Greece, Dynamic Greece)
 Greens
 People's Resistance
 New Democracy
 Kollatos
 Elpida Politias
 Youth Party
 Panathinaiko Kinima 
 Drachmi Greek Democratic Movement Five Stars 
 Ecologist Greens-Pirate Party of Greece
 National Hope
 Rainbow
EL.LA.DA.

 Socialist Party
 Greek European Citizens
 New Greece
Coalition of the Radical Left
 Kinonia Axion
 AKKEL
 Patriotic Unity
Independent Greeks – Panhellenic Citizen Chariot

Opinion polling
Poll results are listed in the table below in reverse chronological order, showing the most recent first. The highest percentage figure in each polling survey is displayed in bold, and the background shaded in the leading party's colour. In the instance that there is a tie, then no figure is shaded. The lead column on the right shows the percentage-point difference between the two parties with the highest figures. Poll results use the date the survey's fieldwork was done, as opposed to the date of publication. However, if such date is unknown, the date of publication will be given instead.

Notes

Results

Elected MEPs

Reactions

Reactions by press
In the press, the conservative Kathimerini newspaper said that citizens had expressed displeasure, but didn't give SYRIZA "true momentum." The SYRIZA-linked daily I Avgi said SYRIZA's win was "historic" and a "milestone in the political history of Greece." Eleftherotypia criticised the government for trying to downplay SYRIZA's win, and said the result showed voters want "radical policy change." Left-leaning Efimerida ton Syntakton said the big loser was the government, and criticised Prime Minister Antonis Samaras for being more critical of SYRIZA than Golden Dawn. Ethnos said all parties were equally punished by the vote.

Reactions by politicians

Following his party's victory, SYRIZA leader Alexis Tsipras called for snap elections to be called "as soon as possible." Tsipras noted that if the results were replicated in a national election, the governing ND-PASOK coalition would have only 94 seats, in contrast to the 152 seats they had at the time of the election. SYRIZA warned that the result meant there was a disharmony between public opinion and the composition of parliament, and that the government lacked a mandate to proceed with any new austerity measures, particularly warning against water privatisation. On 26 May, the day after the election, Tsipras met with President Karolos Papoulias about the potential to hold new elections.

Prime Minister Antonis Samaras (ND) insisted the vote was not a cause for snap elections. In a televised address in the immediate aftermath of the vote, Samaras said that "those who tried to turn the EU election into a plebiscite failed." High-ranking ND officials held a meeting on 3 June to discuss how to woo back voters who had left the party, but were unable to come to a conclusion.

Evangelos Venizelos, leader of junior coalition party PASOK, came under fire from several MPs of his own party, who called on him to quit as leader following PASOK's mediocre result. In an editorial in Ta Nea, which criticised Venizelos' strategy, PASOK MP Costas Skandalidis said "nobody has the legitimacy to decide the fate of a historic party on his own." Skandalidis also urged Venizelos to develop closer contacts with SYRIZA. Venizelos hit back at his intra-party critics, calling them "fifth columnists" who were trying to "consciously undermine" him.

DIMAR leader Fotis Kouvelis announced on 28 May that he would offer his resignation as leader of his party, due to its poor result. However, DIMAR's central committee rejected his resignation. DIMAR and SYRIZA eyed closer co-operation following the vote, although a significant minority of DIMAR MPs support co-operating with PASOK instead. DIMAR decided to choose its political direction at a party conference, scheduled to be held 12–14 September 2014. Until then it was agreed Kouvelis would stay on as leader.

Panos Kammenos, leader of ANEL, also called a party conference due to his party's poor result, although he did not offer his resignation. Instead, Kammenos planned to discuss the possibility of co-operating with other right-wing anti-austerity groups, and offered invitations to several such parties to participate in ANEL's congress. Two ANEL MPs left the party after the election, with one saying the party had "lost its direction."

Cabinet reshuffle
While Prime Minister Samaras vowed to "stay the course," he acknowledged the government must "fix injustices" and planned a "radical" cabinet reshuffle in response to the vote. Key chances included having Finance Minister Yannis Stournaras replaced with former prime-ministerial adviser Gikas Hardouvelis, and ND MP Argyris Dinopoulos replacing Yiannis Michelakis as Interior Minister. Ex-LAOS MP Adonis Georgiadis was replaced as Health Minister by Makis Voridis, a fellow ex-LAOS member. Changes were also made to the Education Minister, Public Order Minister, Development Minister, Agricultural Development Minister, and government spokesperson.

Makis Vordis' appointment to the cabinet was a subject of controversy, with the Anti-Defamation League objecting to his appointment. The ADL claimed his appointment was at odds with the Prime Minister's stance on Golden Dawn. In the 1980s Vordis led the National Political Union, a youth group founded by ex-dictator Georgios Papadopoulos from inside prison, before getting kicked out for engaging in extremist acts. In the 1990s Vordis founded the Hellenic Front, a party with close links to the National Front in France.

Sofia Voultepsi, the newly appointed government spokesperson, was also considered a controversial choice. Prior to her appointment, she said the press was owned by "arms dealers, Rothschild, and bankers", and that undocumented migrants are "invaders" and "weapons in the hands of the Turks."

The new cabinet was sworn in on 10 June.

References

External links
Official results at the Ministry of Internal Affairs

Greece
European Parliament elections in Greece
2014 in Greek politics
Europe